Joan Bulmer (1519–December 1590), born Joan Acworth, was an English gentlewoman and courtier.

The daughter of George Acworth and Margaret Wilberforce, Joan married William Bulmer at a young age. The marriage was short lived, however, as she left his house to enter into the service of Agnes Tilney, the Dowager Duchess of Norfolk. While in service to the duchess, Bulmer became acquainted with Catherine Howard, who would go on to become the fifth wife of King Henry VIII. It was during this time that Joan became involved in an affair with Edward Waldegrave.

When Catherine Howard married Henry VIII, Joan requested that Catherine offer her a place in her household due to their previous association.  When Catherine was arrested, Bulmer was called upon to testify against the Queen and detail the aspects of her early life. 

After Catherine's trial and execution, Joan was released. She subsequently went on to marry Edward Waldegrave and resided at Lawford Hall in Essex.

In film and television
Joan is depicted in the fourth series of The Tudors by Catherine Steadman.

References

1519 births
1590 deaths
16th-century  English women
Household of Catherine Howard